Raghogarh Assembly constituency is one of the 230 Vidhan Sabha (Legislative Assembly) constituencies of Madhya Pradesh state in central India. This constituency came into existence in 1951, as one of the 79 Vidhan Sabha constituencies of the erstwhile Madhya Bharat state.

Overview
Raghogarh (constituency number 31) is one of the four Vidhan Sabha constituencies located in Guna district. This constituency covers parts of Raghogarh and Aron tehsils.

Raghogarh is part of Rajgarh Lok Sabha constituency along with seven other Vidhan Sabha segments, namely, Chachoura in this district, Narsinghgarh, Biaora, Rajgarh, Khilchipur and Sarangpur in Rajgarh district and Susner in Shajapur district.

It has frequently been held by members of one family. In June 2013, Mool Singh, a cousin of Digvijay Singh, announced that he would be stepping down from the seat at the next elections, paving the way for Digvijay's son, Jaivardhan, to be elected in a form of dynastic succession that is common in North India but rare in the South. Mool Singh had suffered a stroke three years previously and gave poor health as the reason for his decision. The constituency has previously been held by Digvijay, his brother Lakshman Singh and by their father, Balbhadra Singh. It was noted in 2003 that the seat has been held by members of the family or their anointed candidates since 1977 and that the main opposition party, the Bharatiya Janata Party, had lost its deposit on all but one occasion in the subsequent five elections up to that date. The candidates who had stood against the family candidate in the first elections from the constituency in 1952 had also lost their deposits.

Members of Legislative Assembly

As a constituency of Madhya Bharat

 1952: Balbhadra Singh, Akhil Bhartiya Hindu Mahasabha

As a constituency of Madhya Pradesh

Election results

2013 results

See also
 Raghogarh-Vijaypur
 Madhya Pradesh Vidhan Sabha

References

Guna district
Assembly constituencies of Madhya Pradesh